Harald Mägi (10 February 1932 in Haljala Parish, Virumaa – 17 January 2012) was an Estonian politician. He was a member of VIII Riigikogu.

References

1932 births
2012 deaths
Members of the Riigikogu, 1995–1999
People from Haljala Parish